Stan Musial Bridge may refer to:
Donora Monessen Bridge in Pennsylvania
Stan Musial Veterans Memorial Bridge in St. Louis, Missouri - East St. Louis, Illinois